Cornice Peak, 3188 m (10459 feet), is a mountain in the Continental Ranges of the Canadian Rockies in Alberta, Canada.

See also
Cornice Peak (disambiguation)

References

Three-thousanders of Alberta
Alberta's Rockies